Jonathan William Nicholas Nicholls (16 June 1956 – 15 March 2022) was the Registrary of the University of Cambridge from October 2007.
He retired from this post at the end of 2016, at which point Emma Rampton became Acting Registrary.

Nicholls was educated at Culford School, the University of Bristol (first class English degree, 1978), and Emmanuel College (PhD, English, 1984).  He was a Herchel Smith Scholar at Harvard. His career began at the University of Warwick, where he was appointed registrar, moving to Birmingham University in 2004.  He was a non-executive director of Graduate Prospects and a member of both the national Joint Negotiating Committee for Higher Education Staff and the advisory board of the Institute for Higher Education Policy.

Nicholls, who was a member of Warwick District Council, died following a car accident on 15 March 2022.

References

1956 births
Living people
People educated at Culford School
Harvard University alumni
Alumni of Emmanuel College, Cambridge
Alumni of the University of Bristol
People associated with the University of Warwick
People associated with the University of Birmingham
Registraries of the University of Cambridge